The Feuchtmayers (also spelled Feuchtmayr, Feichtmair, and Feichtmayr) were a German family of artists from the Baroque Wessobrunner School.

The best-known members of the family were the brothers Franz Joseph, Johann Michael (the Elder), and Michael; their sons; and one grandson:

 Franz Joseph Feuchtmayer (1660–1718)
 Joseph Anton Feuchtmayer (1696–1770)
 Johann Michael Feuchtmayer the Elder (1666–1713)
 Michael Feuchtmayer (b. 1667) was a brother of Franz Joseph and Johann Michael, and the father of Franz Xaver, the Elder, as well as of Johann Michael, the Younger.
 Franz Xaver Feuchtmayer the Elder (1705–1764)
 Franz Xaver Feuchtmayer the Younger (b. 1735)
 Johann Michael Feuchtmayer the Younger (1709–1772)

Bibliography
Austria: A Phaidon Cultural Guide. Oxford: Phaidon, 1985. .
Germany: A Phaidon Cultural Guide. Oxford: Phaidon, 1985. .
Swiss Institute for Art Research's SIKART Dictionary and Database

Gallery of Works by Franz Joseph Feuchtmayer

Gallery of Works by Joseph Anton Feuchtmayer

Gallery of Works by Franz Xaver Feuchtmayer (the Elder)

Gallery of Works by Johann Michael Feuchtmayer (the Younger)
J. M. Feuchtmayer also did work with his brother Franz Xaver that is shown above.

Gallery of Works by Franz Xaver Feuchtmayer (the Younger) 

17th-century German sculptors
18th-century German sculptors
German Baroque sculptors